Mary Blume (born in New York City, New York) is an American historian and biographer, who was a newspaper correspondent in Paris for several years.

Bibliography
After the War was Over: Photographs (with Werner Bischof, 1985)
Cote D'Azur: Inventing the French Riviera (1992)
A French Affair: The Paris Beat, 1965-1998 99)
Master of Us All, The: Balenciaga, His Workrooms, His World (2013)

References

Living people
American biographers
American expatriates in France
21st-century American historians
American critics
Year of birth missing (living people)
Writers from New York City
American women historians
American women biographers
American women journalists
Historians from New York (state)
21st-century American women writers